Cebaara (Tyebala), one of a cluster of languages called Senari, is a major Senufo language, spoken by a million people in Ivory Coast.

Phonology
Cebaara has the following sound inventory:

Consonants 

 /b/ can be heard as a voiced fricative [β] when in intervocalic position.
 Voiceless stops /p, t/ can occur as slightly voiced before /i/ as [p̬, t̬]
 /s/ can be palatalized before an /i/, and can be recognized as a post-alveolar fricative [ʃ] before another vowel in /siV/ position.
 Palatal sounds /c, ɟ/ can also be heard as affricate sounds [t͡ʃ, d͡ʒ] within free variation.
 /ŋ/ can also be heard as a post-nasal [ɡ ̃] within word final positions.

Vowels 

 Vowels /e, o/ can be realized as [ɪ, ʊ] when in shortened form.

References

Senari languages
Languages of Ivory Coast

br:Senareg